Asios vindex is a species of beetle in the family Carabidae, the only species in the genus Asios.

References

Lebiinae